Miss Universe Australia 2017, the 13th Miss Universe Australia pageant, was held on 29 June 2017 at Sofitel Melbourne on Collins in Melbourne, Victoria. Thirty-two contestants from different states in Australia competed. Reigning Miss Universe Australia, Caris Tiivel of Western Australia crowned her successor, Olivia Molly Rogers of South Australia at the end of the event. Olivia Rogers represented Australia in Miss Universe 2017 pageant.

Results

Special awards

Contestants
32 confirmed finalists for Miss Universe Australia 2017

References 

2017 beauty pageants
2017 in Australia